The Sword of Monte Cristo is a 1951 American adventure film written and directed by Maurice Geraghty. The film stars George Montgomery, Rita Corday, Berry Kroeger, William Conrad, Rhys Williams and Steve Brodie. It is loosely based on the 1844 novel The Count of Monte Cristo by Alexandre Dumas. The film was released on March 3, 1951, by 20th Century Fox.

Plot
In 1858 France, Emperor Louis Napoleon sends Captain Renault of the Royal Dragoons, Minister La Roche and Major Nicolet to Normandy in search of the members of a group of rebels. A Masked Cavalier, the niece, Lady Christianne, of the Marquis De Montableau, announces at a secret meeting of the Normandy underground leaders that the fabled treasure of Monte Cristo was willed to her and she will use it to finance their cause. Her uncle, the only one who can decipher the symbols on the sword of Monte Cristo, the key to the treasure, derides her stand against the Emperor. La Roche takes possession of the sword and has the Marquis put into the dungeon. Christianne, as the Masked Cavalier, regains the sword from La Roche, but Captain Renault apprehends her and returns to sword to La Roche, the key to locating the treasure . La Roche has him removed and placed under guard but he manages to escape and with Christianne tries to stop him.

Cast 
George Montgomery as Captain Renault
Rita Corday as Lady Christianne (billed as Paula Corday)
Berry Kroeger as Minister Charles La Roche
William Conrad as Major Nicolet
Rhys Williams as Mayor of Varonne
Steve Brodie as Sergeant 
Robert Warwick as Marquis de Montableau
David Bond as Emperor Napoleon III
Lillian Bronson as Pepite
Acquanetta as Felice
Trevor Bardette as Navarre
Crane Whitley as Hansmann
Leonard Mudie as Court Physician
John Davidson as Artist
George Baxter as Mocquard
Steve Darrell as Courdelay 
Kenneth MacDonald as Chamberlain
Henry Corden as Bouchard
Michael Vallon as Viard
Stuart Holmes as Chatelain

References

External links 
 

1951 films
20th Century Fox films
American adventure films
1951 adventure films
Films based on The Count of Monte Cristo
Films set in the 1850s
Cultural depictions of Napoleon III
Films scored by Raoul Kraushaar
1950s English-language films
1950s American films